A pharyngeal groove (or branchial groove, or pharyngeal cleft) is made up of ectoderm unlike its counterpart the pharyngeal pouch on the endodermal side.

The first pharyngeal groove produces the external auditory meatus (ear canal). The rest (2, 3, and 4) are overlapped by the growing 2nd pharyngeal arch, and form the floor of the depression termed the cervical sinus, which opens ventrally, and is finally obliterated.

See also
 Branchial cleft cyst

References

Animal developmental biology
Pharyngeal arches